Time Teens: The Beginning is a 2015 Scottish feature film directed by Ryan Alexander Dewar. It was originally written as a TV Series by writer/actor Ian Grieve around ten years earlier. Grieve was resident director in Perth Theatre where he met Dewar and they pursued Grieve's TV scripts as a short film.

Plot
Time travel exists. William is a Tourasaiche, Pilgrim Time traveller, policing time crime. When he receives a letter from the future, he has to decide if his future will happen how it is written, or if things can be changed.

Cast
Appearing in the film are:

 Andy Gray as Black Ruthven
 Ralph Riach as The Meridian
 Ian Grieve
 Annie Louise Ross as The Victorian Woman
 Anne Kidd as Ghost Madelaine Lockhart
 Liam Brennan as Edwin
 Tom McGovern as The harlequin
 Helen Mackay

 Irene MacDougall as Andrea Novotny
 Gareth Morrison
 Amanda Beveridge as Miranda
 Emily Winter as Emma
 Richard Addison as Lawrence Toureq
 Michele Gallagher as Jenny Buchan
 Sharon Young as Buccaneer
 Jo Freer as Buccaneer
 Lewis Winter Petrie as Ricky

Production
After filming for four days in 2013, the films duration was too long to be a short film but too short to be a full feature. The short film soon turned into a feature film with a plethora of Scottish cast coming on board the production. The filming occurred within 2 weeks over a one-year period. Production took place in under three weeks over 2013 and 2014. Sponsor contributions made up £5,000 production budget. The release date was put back as Dewar and Grieve appealed for assistance to get the project finished.

Release
The film premiered in February 2015 at the Perth Playhouse Cinema on an IMAX screen and was then shown there for the following 3 weeks.

It had screenings at:
 North By Midwest Micro-budget film festival in Michigan In May 2015
 the Fife Film Expo in Scotland in May 2015 
 Aberdeen International Film Festival in Scotland in October 2015

Reception
Some complained that the film did not include enough teenagers and was perhaps difficult in its concepts for younger audiences. Suggesting that the name could have been changed, though understood it was a pilot for a longer series.

Awards and nominations
Time Teens picked up an award at the monthly San Francisco Film awards and an award from the Accolade Film Award Competition. 
In Spring, the film picked up Best Narrative Feature in the Alaska International Film Festival, Nominated for Best Director in International Euro Film Festival and Ryan won Best Director and Ian, Best Actor in a leading Role at the International Independent Film Awards 2015. At the North by Midwest micro budget film festival, the film also picked up 2nd place for Long feature.

Nomination have extended to the Deep Fried Film Festival for best Science Fiction and nomination for Best Cinematography in Fife Film Expo.

The film opened with generally positive reviews with average weighted ratings between 7 and 8 out of 10.

TV script
Alongside the film, a TV script was also written. The end of the film is 'The Beginning' of the series.

References

External links
 Time Teens : The Beginning Cinema release trailer on YouTube
 
 press release on 13 February 2015 by Tayscreen Scotland
 list of cinemas in Scotland where title is showing by The List

2015 films
2015 fantasy films
2010s science fiction films
2015 psychological thriller films
Scottish films
English-language Scottish films
Films set in 1954
Films set in 2015
Films set in Scotland
Films shot in Scotland
Time loop films
Films about time travel
2015 directorial debut films
2015 drama films
2010s English-language films